The following is a list of left-wing political parties. It includes parties from the centre-left to the far and ultra-left.

Active

A 

Afghanistan Liberation Organization (banned)
Communist (Maoist) Party of Afghanistan (banned)
National United Party of Afghanistan (National Coalition of Afghanistan)
Pashtoons Social Democratic Party
Progressive Democratic Party of Afghanistan
Solidarity Party of Afghanistan
Watan Party of Afghanistan (banned)

Åland Social Democrats
Sustainable Initiative

Albanian Socialist Alliance Party
Albanian Workers Movement Party
Communist Party of Albania
Communist Party of Albania 8 November
G99
Green Party of Albania
Reorganised Party of Labour of Albania
Social Democracy Party of Albania
Social Democratic Party of Albania
Socialist Movement for Integration
Socialist Party of Albania

Algerian Party for Democracy and Socialism
Berber Socialism and Revolution Party
Democratic and Social Movement (Forces of the Democratic Alternative)
Socialist Forces Front (Forces of the Democratic Alternative)
Socialist Workers Party (Forces of the Democratic Alternative)
Workers' Party (Forces of the Democratic Alternative)

Democratic Renewal
Greens of Andorra
Parochial Union of Independents Group
Social Democracy and Progress
Social Democratic Party

CASA–CE
MPLA
New Democracy Electoral Union
Angolan Union for Peace, Democracy and Development
Independent National Alliance of Angola
Independent Social Party of Angola
Liberal Socialist Party
Movement for the Democracy of Angola
National Union for Democracy
Party of the Angolan Communist Community
Social Democratic Party
Social Renewal Party

Antigua and Barbuda Labour Party
Barbuda People's Movement

Authentic Socialist Party (Federal Consensus)
Freemen of the South Movement (Federal Consensus)
Frente de Todos
Broad Front
Civic Front for Santiago
Communist Party of Argentina
Communist Party of Argentina (Extraordinary Congress)
Evita Movement
Federal Commitment
FORJA Concertation Party
Humanist Party
Intransigent Party
Kolina
National Alfonsinist Movement
New Encounter
Patria Grande Front
Popular Unity
Proyecto Sur
Revolutionary Communist Party
Solidary Party
Victory Party
Front for Change/Social Pole
Generation for a National Encounter (Juntos por el Cambio)
Liberation Party
Movement for Socialism
Progressive, Civic and Social Front
Self-determination and Freedom
Socialist Party (Federal Consensus)
Solidarity and Equality
United Socialist Workers' Party
Workers' Left Front
Socialist Left
Socialist Workers' Party
Workers' Party
Workers' Socialist Movement

Armenia Alliance
Armenian Revolutionary Federation
All Armenian Labour Party
Armenian Communist Party
Citizen's Decision
Democratic Party of Armenia
Green Party of Armenia (Free Homeland Alliance)
National Progress Party of Armenia (National Democratic Pole)
People's Party of Armenia
Progressive United Communist Party of Armenia
Social Democrat Hunchakian Party (Armenian National Congress)
United Communist Party of Armenia
United Labour Party (Civil Contract)

Armenian Revolutionary Federation
Communist Party of Artsakh
National Revival
Peace and Development Party

People's Electoral Movement

Australian Greens
ACT Greens
Australian Greens Victoria
Greens New South Wales
Greens South Australia
Greens Western Australia
Northern Territory Greens
Queensland Greens
Tasmanian Greens
Australian Labor Party
Australian Labor Party (Australian Capital Territory Branch)
Australian Labor Party (New South Wales Branch)
Australian Labor Party (Northern Territory Branch)
Australian Labor Party (Queensland Branch)
Australian Labor Party (South Australian Branch)
Australian Labor Party (Tasmanian Branch)
Australian Labor Party (Victorian Branch)
Australian Labor Party (Western Australian Branch)
Communist Party of Australia
Communist Party of Australia (Marxist–Leninist)
Action
Socialist Alliance
Socialist Alternative
Socialist Equality Party
Solidarity
Victorian Socialists

Greens – The Green Alternative, The
KPÖ Plus
Communist Party of Austria
Party of Labour of Austria
Pirate Party of Austria
Social Democratic Party of Austria
Socialist Left Party
Wandel, Der
Workers Viewpoint

Azerbaijan Communist Party
Azerbaijani Social Democratic Party
Azerbaijan United Communist Party
Civic Unity Party
Coordination Council of Leftist Forces
Modern Musavat Party

B 

National Democratic Action Society (Banned)
National Justice Movement
National Liberation Front – Bahrain
Progressive Democratic Tribune

Bangladesh National Awami Party
Communist Party of Bangladesh
Communist Party of Bangladesh (Marxist–Leninist) (Barua)
Communist Party of Bangladesh (Marxist–Leninist) (Dutta)
Communist Party of Bangladesh (Marxist–Leninist) (Umar)
Jatiya Gano Front
Jatiya Samajtantrik Dal (Grand Alliance)
Jatiya Samajtantrik Dal (Rab)
Maoist Bolshevik Reorganisation Movement of the Purba Banglar Sarbahara Party
National Awami Party
National Awami Party (Bhashani) (20 Party Alliance)
Purba Banglar Sarbahara Party
Purbo Banglar Communist Party
Revolutionary Workers Party of Bangladesh
Sramik Krishak Samajbadi Dal
Socialist Party of Bangladesh
United Communist League of Bangladesh
Workers Party of Bangladesh (Grand Alliance)

Barbados Labour Party
Clement Payne Movement
Democratic Labour Party
People's Empowerment Party
People's Party for Democracy and Development

Belarusian Agrarian Party (Republican Coordinating Council of Heads of Political Parties and Public Associations)
Belarusian Green Party
Belarusian Labour Party
Belarusian Left Party "A Just World" (United Democratic Forces of Belarus)
Belarusian Social Democratic Assembly
Belarusian Social Democratic Party (Assembly) (United Democratic Forces of Belarus)
Belarusian Social Democratic Party (People's Assembly)
Belarusian Social Sporting Party (Republican Coordinating Council of Heads of Political Parties and Public Associations)
Belarusian Women's Party "Nadzieja" (United Democratic Forces of Belarus)
Communist Party of Belarus (Republican Coordinating Council of Heads of Political Parties and Public Associations)
Republican Party of Labour and Justice (Republican Coordinating Council of Heads of Political Parties and Public Associations)
Revolutionary Action
Social Democratic Party of Popular Accord

Anticapitalist Left
Committee for Another Policy
Communist Party of Belgium
DierAnimal
Ecolo
Groen
International Workers' League
Left Socialist Party
Red!
Socialist Party
Vivant
Vooruit
Workers' Party of Belgium

Belize People's Front
Belize Progressive Party
Vision Inspired by the People

Action Front for Renewal and Development
Communist Party of Benin
Democratic Renewal Party
Social Democratic Party
Union for Homeland and Labour

Progressive Labour Party

Bhutan Kuen-Nyam Party
Bhutan Peoples' Party
Communist Party of Bhutan (Marxist–Leninist–Maoist)
Bhutan Tiger Force
Druk Nyamrup Tshogpa

Communist Party of Bolivia
Communist Party of Bolivia - Marxist Leninist Maoist
Free Bolivia Movement
Movement for Socialism
Movement for Sovereignty
Pachakuti Indigenous Movement
People's Revolutionary Front (Marxist−Leninist−Maoist)
Revolutionary Left Front
Revolutionary Left Movement
Revolutionary Liberation Movement Tupaq Katari
Revolutionary Workers' Party
Socialist Aymara Group
Socialist Party-1
Workers' Socialist Movement

Bonaire Democratic Party

Bosnian Party
Communist Party
Labour Party of Bosnia and Herzegovina
Social Democratic Party
Socialist Party
Workers' Communist Party of Bosnia and Herzegovina

Botswana Alliance Movement
International Socialist Organization
MELS Movement of Botswana
Umbrella for Democratic Change
Botswana National Front
Botswana People's Party

Brazilian Communist Party
Brazilian Socialist Party
Communist Party of Brazil
Democratic Labour Party
Party of National Mobilization
Popular Unity
Republican Party of the Social Order
Socialism and Liberty Party
United Socialist Workers' Party
Workers' Cause Party
Workers' Party

Breton Democratic Union (Régions et Peuples Solidaires)
Brittany Movement and Progress
Emgann

Brunei People's Party

Agrarian Union "Aleksandar Stamboliyski"
Alternative Socialist Alliance – Independents
BSP for Bulgaria
Alternative for Bulgarian Revival
Bulgarian Left
Bulgarian Socialist Party
Communist Party of Bulgaria
Movement for Social Humanism
Bulgarian Communist Party
Bulgarian Communist Party – Marxists
Bulgarian Social Democratic Party
Bulgarian Workers' Party (Communist)
Civil Union "Roma"
Green Party of Bulgaria
Left Union for a Clean and Holy Republic
Bulgarian Progressive Line
Party of the Bulgarian Communists
Movement 21 (Stand Up.BG! We are coming!)
Party of Bulgarian Social Democrats
Political Movement "Social Democrats" (We Continue the Change)
Union of Communists in Bulgaria

Burkinabé Party for Refoundation
Collective of Democratic Mass Organizations and Political Parties
Congress for Democracy and Progress
Convergence for Social Democracy
Convergence of Hope
Democratic and Popular Rally
February 14th Group
Group of Patriotic Democrats
Party for Democracy and Progress / Socialist Party
Party for Democracy and Socialism
Patriotic Front for Change
Union for Rebirth / Sankarist Party
Movement for Tolerance and Progress
National Patriots' Party
New Alliance of Faso
New Era for Democracy
Party for Democracy and Socialism/Metba
Party of Independence, Labour and Justice
People's Movement for Progress
Rally for Democracy and Socialism
Sankarist Democratic Front
Social Forces Front
Socialist Alliance
Unified Socialist Party
Voltaic Revolutionary Communist Party

Front for Democracy in Burundi
Pan Africanist Socialist Movement – Inkinzo

C 

Beehive Social Democratic Party
Grassroots Democratic Party
League for Democracy Party

Social Democratic Front
Union of the Peoples of Cameroon

BC Ecosocialists
Bloc Québécois
Coalition of Progressive Electors
Communist Party of Canada
Communist Party of British Columbia
Communist Party of Canada (Manitoba)
Communist Party of Canada (Ontario)
Communist Party of Canada (Saskatchewan)
Communist Party – Alberta
Communist Party of Canada (Marxist–Leninist)
Marxist–Leninist Party of Quebec
Go Vegan
Green Party of Alberta
Green Party of British Columbia
Green Party of New Brunswick
Green Party of Ontario
Green Party of Quebec
International Socialists
New Democratic Party
Alberta New Democratic Party
British Columbia New Democratic Party
New Brunswick New Democratic Party
New Democratic Party of Manitoba
New Democratic Party of Prince Edward Island
Newfoundland and Labrador New Democratic Party
Nova Scotia New Democratic Party
Ontario New Democratic Party
Saskatchewan New Democratic Party
Yukon New Democratic Party
New Democratic Party of Quebec
OneCity Vancouver
Parti Québécois
Peoples Political Party, The
Projet Montréal
Québec solidaire
Gauche Socialiste
Revolutionary Communist Party
Socialist Action
Socialist Alternative
Socialist Alternative (Quebec)
Socialist Party of Canada
Socialist Party of Ontario

African Party for the Independence of Cape Verde
Labour and Solidarity Party

People's Progressive Movement

Central African Democratic Rally
Movement for the Liberation of the Central African People
National Convergence "Kwa Na Kwa"
Patriotic Front for Progress
Social Democratic Party
United Hearts Movement

Chadian Action for Unity and Socialism
National Union for Democracy and Renewal
Socialist Party without Borders

Apruebo Dignidad
Broad Front
Common Force
Commons
Democratic Revolution
Social Convergence
Unir Movement
Chile Digno
Communist Party of Chile
Libertarian Left
Social Green Regionalist Federation
Chilean Communist Party (Proletarian Action)
Liberal Party of Chile (New Social Pact)
List of the People, The
New Deal (New Social Pact)
Non-Neutral Independents
Party for Democracy (New Social Pact)
Patriotic Union
Progressive Party
Revolutionary Left Movement
Revolutionary Workers Party
Socialist Party of Chile (New Social Pact)
Wallmapuwen

Maoist Communist Party of China (Banned)
United Front (Disputed) 
China Association for Promoting Democracy
China Democratic League
China National Democratic Construction Association
China Zhi Gong Party
Chinese Communist Party
Chinese Peasants' and Workers' Democratic Party
Jiusan Society
Revolutionary Committee of the Chinese Kuomintang
Taiwan Democratic Self-Government League
Zhi Xian Party (Banned)

Colombian Communist Party
Colombian Communist Party – Maoist
Colombian Liberal Party
Colombian Social Democratic Party
Communist Party of Colombia (Marxist–Leninist)
Democratic Unity Party
Historic Pact for Colombia
Alternative Democratic Pole
Commons
Humane Colombia
Patriotic Union
Independent Social Alliance Movement (Coalition of Hope)
Indigenous Authorities of Colombia
Presentes por el Socialismo
Revolutionary Communist Group of Colombia
Revolutionary Independent Labour Movement
Unionist Movement

Convention for the Renewal of the Comoros

Common Front for Congo
People's Party for Reconstruction and Democracy
Heading for Change
Union for Democracy and Social Progress
Union for the Congolese Nation
Social Movement for Renewal
Unified Lumumbist Party

Action and Renewal Movement
Congolese Party of Labour
Pan-African Union for Social Democracy
Union for the Republic

Corsica Libera
Party of the Corsican Nation

Broad Front
Citizens' Action Party
Patriotic Alliance
Popular Vanguard Party
Workers' Party

Bandić Milan 365 – Labour and Solidarity Party
Bosniak Democratic Party of Croatia
Civic Liberal Alliance (Restart Coalition)
Croatian Labourists – Labour Party
Croatian Party of Pensioners
Croatian Social Democrats
Croatian Workers Party
Democratic Alliance of Serbs
Democrats
Green–Left Coalition
New Left
Sustainable Development of Croatia
We can!
Independent Democratic Serb Party
Istrian Social Democratic Forum
Left of Croatia
Lista za Rijeku - Lista per Fiume
Red Action
Serb People's Party
Social Democratic Party of Croatia (Restart Coalition)
Socialist Labour Party of Croatia
Workers' Front

Communist Party of Cuba
Cuban Democratic Socialist Current (Banned)
Democratic Social-Revolutionary Party of Cuba (Banned)

Partido MAN
People's Crusade Labour Party
Sovereign People
Workers' Liberation Front

Cyprus Social Ecology Movement
Jasmine Movement
LASOK
Movement for Social Democracy
Movement of Ecologists – Citizens' Cooperation
New Cyprus Party
New Internationalist Left
Progressive Party of Working People
United Cyprus Party
Workers' Democracy

Communist Party of Bohemia and Moravia
Czech National Socialist Party
Czech Social Democratic Party
Democratic Party of Greens (Alliance for the Future)
Green Party
National Socialists – Left of the 21st century
Left, The
Party for Dignified Life
Party of Civic Rights
Socialist Alternative Future
Socialist Organisation of Working People
Socialist Solidarity

D 

The Alternative
Communist Party
Communist Party in Denmark
Folkeringen
Independent Greens
International Socialists
Red–Green Alliance
Communist Party of Denmark
Socialist Workers Party
Social Democrats
Socialist People's Party
United Democrats
Workers' Communist Party

Union for the Presidential Majority
Front for the Restoration of Unity and Democracy
National Democratic Party
People's Rally for Progress
Social Democratic People's Party
Union of Reform Partisans

Dominica Labour Party

 
Broad Front
Civic Renovation Party (Progressive Bloc)
Communist Party of Labour
Country Alliance
Democratic Choice (Alliance for Democracy)
Green Socialist Party
International Communist Party
People's Force
Revolutionary Social Democratic Party
Social Democratic Institutional Bloc

E 

Christian Democratic Party
Frenti-Mudança
Fretilin
National Congress for Timorese Reconstruction
Socialist Party of Timor

Communist Party of Ecuador
Communist Party of Ecuador – Red Sun
Democratic Left
Pachakutik Plurinational Unity Movement – New Country
Revolutionary and Democratic Ethical Green Movement
Popular Unity
Marxist–Leninist Communist Party of Ecuador
Socialist Party – Broad Front of Ecuador
Union for Hope
Citizen Revolution Movement
Workers' Party of Ecuador

Arab Democratic Nasserist Party (Egypt, National Front Alliance)
Civil Democratic Movement
Bread and Freedom Party
Constitution Party
Dignity Party (National Front Alliance)
Egyptian Social Democratic Party
Freedom Egypt Party
Socialist Popular Alliance Party
Egyptian Arab Socialist Party
Egyptian Communist Party
Egyptian Green Party
Egyptian Islamic Labour Party (Anti-Coup Alliance)
Egyptian Popular Current
Free Social Constitutional Party
Homeland Defenders Party (Call of Egypt)
National Progressive Unionist Party (National Front Alliance)
Revolutionary Socialists
Social Justice Party
Socialist Party of Egypt
United Nasserist Party
Workers and Peasants Party
Workers Democratic Party

Democratic Change
Farabundo Martí National Liberation Front

Convergence for Social Democracy
Movement for the Self-Determination of Bioko Island (Banned)

Eritrean National Salvation Front
Eritrean People's Democratic Front
People's Front for Democracy and Justice

Estonian Greens
Estonian United Left Party
Social Democratic Party

Communist Party of Swaziland
Ngwane National Liberatory Congress
People's United Democratic Movement
Swazi Democratic Party

Afar Revolutionary Democratic Unity Front
All-Ethiopia Socialist Movement
Coalition of Ethiopian Federalist Forces
Ethiopian People's Revolutionary Party
Medrek
Arena Tigray
Ogaden National Liberation Front
Oromo Liberation Front
Tigray People's Liberation Front (United Front of Ethiopian Federalist and Confederalist Forces)

F 

Republic
Social Democratic Party (Social Democrats)

Fiji Labour Party

Communist Party of Finland
Communist Workers' Party – For Peace and Socialism (Unregistered)
Feminist Party
Left Alliance
Social Democratic Party of Finland 
Socialist Alternative

Anticapitalist Left
Groen
Left Socialist Party
Red!
Vivant
Vooruit
Workers' Party of Belgium

Alternative libertaire
Anarchist Federation
Citizen and Republican Movement
Republican and Socialist Left
Ecologist Party
Ensemble!
Europe Ecology – The Greens
French Communist Party
Génération.s
Independent Workers' Party
La France Insoumise
Left Party
Ligue trotskyste de France
Lutte Ouvrière
Marxist–Leninist Communist Organization – Proletarian Way
Movement of Progressives
New Anticapitalist Party
New Deal
Occitan Party
Place Publique
Pole of Communist Revival in France
Progressives, The
Radical Party of the Left
Revolutionary Left
Socialist Party
Territories of Progress (Ensemble Citoyens)
Union communiste libertaire
Workers' Communist Party of France

Decolonization and Social Emancipation Movement
Guianese Socialist Party
Walwari

Tahoera'a Huiraatira (Union of Democrats and Independents)
Tavini Huiraatira (Democratic and Republican Left group)

G 

African Forum for Reconstruction
Gabonese Socialist Party
Gabonese Progress Party
Social Democratic Party
Union of the Gabonese People

National Convention Party
People's Democratic Organisation for Independence and Socialism

Communist Party of Georgia
European Socialists
Georgian Labour Party
Georgian Troupe
Intellectuals League of Georgia
New Communist Party of Georgia
Social Democrats for the Development of Georgia
Unified Communist Party of Georgia
Unity

Alliance 90/The Greens
Association for Solidarity Perspectives
Communist Party of Germany
Communist Party of Germany (Roter Morgen)
German Communist Party
Human Environment Animal Protection
The Left
Socialist Alternative
Marxist–Leninist Party of Germany
Social Democratic Party of Germany
Social Liberal Democratic Party
Socialist Equality Party
Workers' Power

Convention People's Party
Democratic People's Party
Ghana Union Movement
National Democratic Congress
National Democratic Party
People's National Convention

GSLP–Liberal Alliance
Gibraltar Socialist Labour Party
Together Gibraltar

Active Citizens
Antarsya
New Left Current
Organization of Communist Internationalists of Greece–Spartacus
Revolutionary Communist Movement of Greece
Socialist Workers' Party
Christian Democracy
Communist Organization of Greece
Communist Party of Greece
Communist Party of Greece (Marxist–Leninist)
Communist Renewal
Course of Freedom
Democratic Regional Union
Democratic Social Movement
Ecologist Greens
Fighting Socialist Party of Greece
Free Citizens
Greens - Solidarity
Internationalist Workers' Left
Marxist–Leninist Communist Party of Greece
MeRA25
Movement for Change
Movement of Democratic Socialists
PASOK
Agreement for the New Greece
Movement for the Reorganization of the Communist Party of Greece 1918–1955
Organization for the Reconstruction of the Communist Party of Greece
Organisation of Internationalist Communists of Greece
Panhellenic Citizen Chariot
Popular Unions of Bipartisan Social Groups
Popular Unity
I Don't Pay Movement
Left Anti-capitalist Group
Left Recomposition
New Fighter
Social Agreement
Start – Socialist Internationalist Organisation
Syriza
Democratic Left
Movement for the United in Action Left
Radicals
ROZA
Society First
Workers Revolutionary Party

Inuit Ataqatigiit
Nunatta Qitornai
Siumut (Social Democrats)

Grenada United Labour Party
National Democratic Congress

Guadeloupe Communist Party

Guatemalan National Revolutionary Unity
Movement for the Liberation of Peoples
National Unity of Hope
Semilla
Winaq

Democratic Party of Guinea – African Democratic Rally
Rally of the Guinean People

African Party for the Independence of Guinea and Cape Verde
Madem G15
Party for Social Renewal
Socialist Party of Guinea-Bissau
United Social Democratic Party
Workers' Party

A Partnership for National Unity
Guyana Action Party
People's National Congress
Working People's Alliance
People's Progressive Party

H 

Fanmi Lavalas
Fusion of Haitian Social Democrats (Coalition of Progressive Parliamentarians)
New Haitian Communist Party (Marxist–Leninist)
Struggling People's Organization (Coalition of Progressive Parliamentarians)

Communist Party of Honduras
Democratic Unification Party
FAPER
Innovation and Unity Party
Liberty and Refoundation

April Fifth Action (Pro-democracy camp)
Civic Act-up (Pro-democracy camp)
Civic Party (Pro-democracy camp)
The Frontier (Pro-democracy camp)
Hong Kong Association for Democracy and People's Livelihood (Pro-democracy camp)
Hong Kong Federation of Trade Unions (Pro-Beijing camp)
Labour Party (Pro-democracy camp)
Land Justice League (Pro-democracy camp)
League of Social Democrats (Pro-democracy camp)
Neighbourhood and Worker's Service Centre (Pro-democracy camp)
People Power (Pro-democracy camp)
Revolutionary Communist Party of China (Pro-democracy camp)
Socialist Action (Pro-democracy camp)

Democratic Coalition (United Opposition)
Dialogue for Hungary (United Opposition)
Hungarian Social Green Party
Hungarian Socialist Party (United Opposition)
Hungarian Socialist Workers' Party
Hungarian Workers' Party
LMP – Hungary's Green Party (United Opposition)
Social Democratic Party of Hungary
Táncsics – Radical Left Party
Workers' Party of Hungary 2006 - European Left
Yes Solidarity for Hungary Movement

I 

Humanist Party
Icelandic Socialist Party
Left-Green Movement
People's Front of Iceland
Rainbow
Social Democratic Alliance

All India Anna Dravida Munnetra Kazhagam
All India Forward Bloc
Bahujan Samaj Party
Bharatiya Minorities Suraksha Mahasangh
Communist Party of India
Communist Party of India (Maoist)
Communist Party of India (Marxist)
Communist Party of India (Marxist–Leninist) Liberation
Dravida Munnetra Kazhagam
Dravidar Kazhagam
Indian National Congress
Janata Dal (Secular)
Janata Dal (United)
Janganotantrik Morcha
Janta Congress Chhattisgarh
Kangleipak Communist Party
Loktantrik Janata Dal
Maoist Communist Party of Manipur
Marumalarchi Dravida Munnetra Kazhagam
Pragatisheel Samajwadi Party (Lohiya)
Rashtriya Janata Dal
Revolutionary Communist Party of India
Revolutionary Socialist Party
Samajwadi Party
Sikkim Democratic Front
Socialist Party (India)
Socialist Unity Centre of India (Communist)
Tamil Maanila Congress
Viduthalai Chiruthaigal Katchi
Vikassheel Insaan Party

Indonesian Democratic Party of Struggle
Indonesian Green Party
Indonesian Solidarity Party
Just and Prosperous People's Party
Labour Party (2021)

Assembly of the Forces of Imam's Line (Council for Coordinating the Reforms Front (Iranian Reformists))
Communist Party of Iran
Communist Party of Iran (Marxist–Leninist–Maoist)
Council of Nationalist-Religious Activists of Iran (Iranian dissidents)
Democratic Party of Iranian Kurdistan (Congress of Nationalities for a Federal Iran)
Fedaian Organisation (Minority)
Islamic Association of Teachers of Iran (Council for Coordinating the Reforms Front (Iranian Reformists))
Iran Party (National Front (Iranian dissidents))
Iranian People's Fedai Guerrillas
Islamic Iran Solidarity Party (Council for Coordinating the Reforms Front (Iranian Reformists))
Komala Party of Iranian Kurdistan (Congress of Nationalities for a Federal Iran)
Komalah (CPI)
Kurdistan Democratic Party
Kurdistan Free Life Party
Laborers' Party of Iran
Labour Party of Iran (Toufan)
Mojahedin of the Islamic Revolution of Iran Organization (Council for Coordinating the Reforms Front (Iranian Reformists))
NEDA Party (Iranian Reformists)
Office for Strengthening Unity (Council for Coordinating the Reforms Front (Iranian Reformists))
Organization of Iranian People's Fedai Guerrillas
Organization of Iranian People's Fedai Guerrillas – Followers of the Identity Platform
Organization of Iranian People's Fedaian (Majority)
Southern Azerbaijan National Awakening Movement (Congress of Nationalities for a Federal Iran)
Tudeh Party of Iran
Union of People's Fedaian of Iran
Worker House (Council for Coordinating the Reforms Front (Iranian Reformists))
Worker-communist Party of Iran
Worker-communist Party of Iran – Hekmatist
Worker's Way
Workers Left Unity – Iran

Arab Socialist Ba'ath Party – Iraq Region
Arab Revolutionary Workers Party (National Democratic Rally)
Assyrian Socialist Party
Civil Democratic Alliance
National Democratic Party
Communist Party of Kurdistan – Iraq (Kurdistan List)
Iraqi Communist Party (Alliance Towards Reforms)
Iraqi National Accord (Al-Wataniya)
Kurdistan Democratic Solution Party
Kurdistan Socialist Democratic Party
Kurdistan Toilers' Party
Left Worker-communist Party of Iraq
Nasserist Socialist Vanguard Party
Patriotic Union of Kurdistan (Kurdistani Coalition)
Popular Unity Party
Worker-communist Party of Iraq
Worker-communist Party of Kurdistan

32 County Sovereignty Movement
An Rabharta Glas
Communist Party of Ireland
Éirígí
Fís Nua
Green Party
Independent Left
Independents 4 Change
Irish Republican Socialist Party
Irish Socialist Network
Kerry Independent Alliance
Labour Party
People Before Profit–Solidarity
People Before Profit
Socialist Workers Network 
RISE
Solidarity
Socialist Party
Cross-Community Labour Alternative
Republican Network for Unity
Republican Sinn Féin
Right to Change
Saoradh
Sinn Féin
Social Democratic and Labour Party
Socialist Democracy
Social Democrats
Workers and Unemployed Action
Workers' Party

Arab Democratic Party (Joint List)
Balad (Joint List)
Da'am Workers Party
Green Party
Hadash (Joint List)
Maki
Ihud Bnei HaBrit
Israeli Labor Party
Habonim Dror
HaNoar HaOved VeHaLomed
Meimad
Meretz
Hashomer Hatzair
Meretz Youth
Young Meretz
Socialist Struggle Movement
U'Bizchutan

Anticapitalist Left
Article One
Communist Alternative Party
Communist Party
Communist Refoundation Party
Democracy and Autonomy
Democratic Party
Fatherland and Constitution
Green Europe
Greens of South Tyrol
Italian Communist Party 
Italian Left
Italian Marxist–Leninist Party
Italian Socialist Party 
Possible
Power to the People
Solidary Democracy
Workers' Communist Party

Ivorian Popular Front
Ivorian Workers' Party
People's Socialist Union
Revolutionary Communist Party of Ivory Coast

J 

People's National Party

Greens Japan
Japan Revolutionary Communist League
Japan Revolutionary Communist League (Revolutionary Marxist Faction)
Japanese Communist Party
Japanese Communist Party (Action Faction)
Japanese Communist Party (Left Faction)
New Socialist Party of Japan
Okinawa Social Mass Party
Reiwa Shinsengumi
Revolutionary Communist League, National Committee
Social Democratic Party

Reform Jersey

Civil Alliance Party
Jordanian Communist Party
Jordanian Democratic People's Party
Jordanian Democratic Popular Unity Party
Ma'an List

K 

Auyl People's Democratic Patriotic Party
Communist Party of Kazakhstan
People's Party of Kazakhstan
Nationwide Social Democratic Party
Socialist Resistance of Kazakhstan

Communist Party of Kenya
Madaraka People's Movement
National Super Alliance
Chama Cha Uzalendo
Forum for the Restoration of Democracy – Kenya
Muungano Party
Orange Democratic Movement
Wiper Democratic Movement – Kenya
Safina

Green Party of Kosovo
Movement for Unification
Social Democratic Initiative
Social Democratic Party of Kosovo
Social Democratic Union
Vetëvendosje

Kuwait Democratic Forum
Kuwaiti Progressive Movement

Ata Meken Socialist Party
Communist Party of Kyrgyzstan
Party of Communists of Kyrgyzstan
Social Democratic Party of Kyrgyzstan

L 

Lao People's Revolutionary Party

Latvian Russian Union
Latvian Social Democratic Workers' Party
New Harmony
Progressives, The
Social Democratic Party "Harmony"
Socialist Party of Latvia

Al-Mourabitoun (March 8 Alliance)
Arab Democratic Party (March 8 Alliance)
Arab Socialist Movement
Armenian Revolutionary Federation in Lebanon (March 8 Alliance)
Citizens in a State
Communist Action Organization in Lebanon
Democratic Left Movement (March 14 Alliance)
Lebanese Communist Party
Lebanese Social Democratic Party
Nasserist Unionists Movement (March 8 Alliance)
People's Movement (March 8 Alliance)
Popular Nasserist Organization (March 8 Alliance)
Revolutionary Communist Group
Social Democrat Hunchakian Party (March 14 Alliance)
Solidarity Party (March 8 Alliance)
Syrian Social Nationalist Party in Lebanon (March 8 Alliance)
Toilers League (March 8 Alliance)
Union Party (March 8 Alliance)

Basutoland Congress Party
Communist Party of Lesotho
Democratic Congress
Lesotho Congress for Democracy
Lesotho Workers' Party
Popular Front for Democracy

Liberian People's Party
National Democratic Coalition
United People's Party

Libyan National Movement
Libyan Popular National Movement
National Front Party

Free List

Lithuanian People's Party
Lithuanian Regions Party
Social Democratic Party of Lithuania
Socialist People's Front

Communist Party of Luxembourg
Greens, The
Left, The
Luxembourg Socialist Workers' Party

M

Congress Party for the Independence of Madagascar
Madagascar Green Party
Malagasy Revolutionary Party
Social Democratic Party of Madagascar

Alliance for Democracy

Pakatan Harapan
Democratic Action Party
National Trust Party
People's Justice Party
United Progressive Kinabalu Organisation
Parti Rakyat Malaysia
Sabah Heritage Party
Sabah People's Unity Party
Sabah Progressive Party (Gabungan Rakyat Sabah, Perikatan Nasional)
Socialist Alternative
Socialist Party of Malaysia

African Solidarity for Democracy and Independence
Alliance for Democracy in Mali
Rally for Mali

AD+PD
Labour Party

Manx Labour Party
Mec Vannin

Martinican Communist Party
Martinican Independence Movement
Martinican Progressive Party

Alliance for Justice and Democracy/Movement for Renewal
People's Progressive Alliance
Rally of Democratic Forces

Labour Party
Lalit 
Mauritian Militant Movement
Militant Socialist Movement
Muvman Liberater
Parti Malin
Plateforme Militante
Reform Party
Rodrigues Movement
Rodrigues People's Organisation

Citizens' Movement
Coalition of Workers, Peasants, and Students of the Isthmus
Communist Party of Mexico
Communist Party of Mexico (Marxist–Leninist)
Communists' Party
Labor Party
Marxist–Leninist Centre in Mexico
Morena
Party of the Democratic Revolution
Popular Socialist Party
Popular Socialist Party of Mexico
Progressive Party of Coahuila
Socialist Party of Mexico
Socialist Unity League
Socialist Workers Movement

Centrist Union of Moldova
Collective Action Party – Civic Congress
Democratic Party of Moldova
Electoral Bloc of Communists and Socialists
Party of Communists of the Republic of Moldova
Party of Regions of Moldova
Party of Socialists of the Republic of Moldova
People's Party of the Republic of Moldova
Revival Party
Socialist Party of Moldova
Working People's Party

Mongolian Green Party
Mongolian People's Party
Mongolian Social Democratic Party
Motherland Party
Right Person Electorate Coalition

New Left
Social Democratic Party of Montenegro
Social Democrats of Montenegro
United Reform Action (In Black and White)
Yugoslav Communist Party of Montenegro

Action Party
Democratic Way
Federation of the Democratic Left
Front of Democratic Forces
National Ittihadi Congress
Party of Progress and Socialism
Socialist Democratic Vanguard Party
Socialist Union of Popular Forces
Unified Socialist Party

FRELIMO

Communist Party of Burma
Democratic Party for a New Society
National League for Democracy
National Unity Party
Shan Nationalities League for Democracy
United Wa State Party

N 

Affirmative Repositioning
All People's Party
Congress of Democrats
Landless People's Movement
Namibian Economic Freedom Fighters
Rally for Democracy and Progress
SWANU
SWAPO
Workers Revolutionary Party

 
Major parties

Communist Party of Nepal (Maoist Centre)
Communist Party of Nepal (Marxist–Leninist)
Communist Party of Nepal (Unified Marxist–Leninist)
Communist Party of Nepal (Unified Socialist) 
Minor parties
Communist Party of Nepal
Minor parties

Jana Jagaran Party Nepal
Khambuwan Rashtriya Morcha, Nepal
Lokdal

Madhesi Janadhikar Forum Madhesh

Nepal Samajbadi Party (Lohiyabadi)
Nepal Samajwadi Janata Dal

Nepal Sukumbasi Party (Loktantrik)
Nepal Workers Peasants Party

Nepali Jantantra Party

Rastriya Jana Ekta Party
Rastriya Janamorcha
Rastriya Janamukti Party
Rastriya Janata Dal Nepal

Sanghiya Loktantrik Rastriya Manch

BIJ1
De Basis
DENK
Greens, The
GroenLinks
Group of Marxist–Leninists/Red Dawn
International Socialists
Labour Party
New Communist Party of the Netherlands
Party for the Animals
Party The New Human
Socialist Alternative
Socialist Alternative Politics
Socialist Party
Ubuntu Connected Front
United Communist Party
Water Natuurlijk

Caledonian Union
Kanak Socialist Liberation
Kanak Socialist National Liberation Front
Labour Party
Party of Kanak Liberation
Renewed Caledonian Union

Alliance
Communist League
Green Party of Aotearoa New Zealand
Mana Movement
New Zealand Labour Party
Social Credit Party
Socialist Aotearoa
Workers Party of New Zealand

Communist Party of Nicaragua
Marxist–Leninist Popular Action Movement
Nicaraguan Socialist Party
Sandinista National Liberation Front
Sandinista Renovation Movement

Nigerien Party for Democracy and Socialism
Party for Socialism and Democracy in Niger
Sawaba
Social Democratic Party
Social Democratic Rally

African Action Congress
All Progressives Congress
Communist Party of Nigeria
Labour Party
Social Democratic Party
Socialist Party of Nigeria
Democratic Socialist Movement

Chondoist Chongu Party
Korean Social Democratic Party
Workers' Party of Korea (Disputed)

Communist Party of Macedonia
Democratic Union for Integration
Left, The
Party of United Democrats of Macedonia (VMRO-DPMNE)
Social Democratic Party of Macedonia
Social Democratic Union of Macedonia
New Social Democratic Party
Socialist Party of Macedonia (VMRO-DPMNE)
Union of Tito's Left Forces

Communal Democracy Party
Communal Liberation Party New Forces
Republican Turkish Party

Democratic Party

Communist Party of Norway
Communist Platform
Green Party
International Socialists
Internationalist League of Norway
Labour Party
Red Party
Socialist Left Party
Society Party

P 

Awami National Party
Awami Tahreek
Awami Workers Party
Baloch Republican Party
Balochistan National Party (Mengal)
Barabri Party Pakistan
Communist Party of Pakistan
Communist Party of Pakistan (Thaheem)
Hazara Democratic Party
Jamhoori Wattan Party
Mazdoor Kisan Party
Muttahida Qaumi Movement
National Democratic Movement
National Party
Pak Sarzameen Party
Pakistan Peoples Party
Pakistan Peoples Party Workers
Pakistan Peoples Party (Shaheed Bhutto)
Qaumi Watan Party
Shia Ulema Council
Sindh Taraqi Pasand Party
Socialist Movement Pakistan

Palestine Liberation Organization
Democratic Front for the Liberation of Palestine
Fatah
Palestinian Arab Front
Palestinian Democratic Union
Palestinian Liberation Front
Palestinian People's Party
Palestinian Popular Struggle Front
Popular Front for the Liberation of Palestine
Palestinian Communist Party
Palestinian National Initiative
Revolutionary Palestinian Communist Party
Socialist Struggle Movement

Broad Front for Democracy
Communist Party (Marxist–Leninist) of Panama
Democratic Revolutionary Party 
People's Party of Panama

Papua New Guinea Greens
People's Labour Party
Social Democratic Party

Christian Democratic Party
Great Renewed National Alliance
Guasú Front
National Encounter Party
Paraguayan Communist Party 
Partido Patria Libre
Party for a Country of Solidarity
Progressive Democratic Party
Revolutionary Febrerista Party
Tekojoja People's Party
Workers' Party

Broad Front
Communist Party of Peru – Red Fatherland
Peruvian Communist Party
Socialist Party
Communist Party of Peru (Marxist–Leninist)
Direct Democracy
Free Peru
National United Renaissance
Peruvian Nationalist Party
Revolutionary Socialist Party
Shining Path
Socialist Workers Party
Socialist Workers Party (1992)
Together for Peru

Akbayan
Aksyon Demokratiko
Bayan Muna
Communist Party of the Philippines
Gabriela Women's Party
Labor Party Philippines
Liberal Party of the Philippines
Partido Komunista ng Pilipinas-1930
Partido Lakas ng Masa
PDP–Laban
People's Reform Party
Philippine Democratic Socialist Party
Philippine Green Republican Party
Pwersa ng Masang Pilipino
Revolutionary Workers' Party
Sanlakas

Democratic Left Alliance
Feminist Initiative
Freedom and Equality
Greens, The (Civic Coalition)
Labour Union
Left, The
Left Together
New Left
Polish Socialist Party
National Party of Retirees and Pensioners
Polish Communist Party
Polish Initiative (Civic Coalition)
Polish Labour Party - August 80
Polish Left
Social Democracy of Poland
Socialist Alternative
Workers' Democracy
Your Movement

Left Bloc
LIVRE
Portuguese Labour Party
Portuguese Workers' Communist Party
Socialist Alternative Movement
Socialist Party
Unitary Democratic Coalition
Ecologist Party "The Greens"
Portuguese Communist Party
Workers' Party of Socialist Unity

Hostosian National Independence Movement
Movimiento Unión Soberanista
Movimiento Victoria Ciudadana
Puerto Rican Communist Party
Puerto Rican Independence Party
Puerto Rican Workers' Revolutionary Party
Puerto Ricans for Puerto Rico Party
Socialist Front
Workers' Socialist Movement
Working People's Party

Q 

Parti Québécois
Québec solidaire
Option nationale
Socialist Alternative

R 

Communist Party of Réunion

Assyrian Democratic Organization
Democratic Socialist Arab Ba'ath Party
Honor and Rights Convention
Kongreya Star
Democratic Union Party (TEV-DEM)
Syrian National Democratic Alliance

Romanian Socialist Party
Green Party

A Just Russia
All-Union Communist Party (Bolsheviks)
All-Union Communist Party of Bolsheviks
Alliance of the Revolutionary Socialists
Civilian Power
Communist Party of Social Justice
Communist Party of the Russian Federation
Communist Party of the Soviet Union
Communists of Russia
Green Alternative
Labour Russia
Left Front
Russian Communist Workers' Party of the Communist Party of the Soviet Union
Vanguard of Red Youth
Party of Business
Party of Peace and Unity
Party of Russia's Rebirth
Party of the Dictatorship of the Proletariat
Pyotr Alexeyev' Resistance Movement
Revolutionary Workers' Party
Russian Maoist Party
Russian Socialist Movement
Russian United Labour Front
Socialist Alternative
Yabloko

S 

Saba Labour Party

Saint Kitts and Nevis Labour Party

Saint Lucia Labour Party

Unity Labour Party

Party of Socialists and Democrats 
Active Citizenship
United Left
Civic 10

MLSTP/PSD

Arab Socialist Action Party – Arabian Peninsula

Scottish National Party
Scottish Labour Party
RISE – Scotland's Left Alliance
Scottish Socialist Party
Scottish Green Party
Solidarity
Socialist Party Scotland
Communist Party of Scotland

Socialist Party of Senegal, 
Party of Independence and Labor
And-Jëf/African Party for Democracy and Socialism
Authentic Socialist Party
African Independence Party – Renewal
Social Democratic Party/Jant Bi

Communist Party
Democratic Party
Greens of Serbia
League of Social Democrats of Vojvodina
Movement of Socialists
New Communist Party of Yugoslavia
Party of Labour
Party of United Pensioners of Serbia
Reformists of Vojvodina
Rich Serbia
Social Democracy
Social Democratic Party
Social Democratic Party of Serbia
Social Democratic Union
Socialist Party of Serbia
Socialist People's Party
Together for Serbia

People's Party

Workers' Party of Singapore
Socialist Front

Voice – Social Democracy
Direction – Slovak Social Democracy
Communist Party of Slovakia
100 Percent - Civic Voice

Initiative for Democratic Socialism (United Left)
Positive Slovenia
Social Democrats

Solomon Islands Labour Party

Peace, Unity, and Development Party
For Justice and Development
Wadani

African National Congress (Tripartite Alliance)
African People's Convention
Azanian People's Organisation
Black First Land First
Democratic Left Front
Democratic Socialist Movement
Economic Freedom Fighters
Keep Left
Pan Africanist Congress of Azania
Socialist Party of Azania
South African Communist Party (Tripartite Alliance)
Workers and Socialist Party
Workers International Vanguard League
Zabalaza Anarchist Communist Front

Justice Party
Minjung Party
Labor Party
Green Party
Our Future

Communist Party of South Ossetia

Communist Party of South Sudan

Spanish Socialist Workers' Party
Unidos Podemos
Podemos
Equo
Building the Left–Socialist Alternative
United Left 
Communist Party of Spain
Feminist Party of Spain
Izquierda Abierta
Republican Left
Revolutionary Workers' Party
Revolutionary Socialism
Republican Alternative

Sri Lanka Freedom Party
Communist Party of Sri Lanka
Janatha Vimukthi Peramuna
Lanka Sama Samaja Party
United Socialist Party
Tamil National Alliance

Arab Socialist Ba'ath Party – Organization of Sudan
Arab Socialist Ba'ath Party – Region of Sudan
Islamic Socialist Party
Sudanese Ba'ath Party
Sudanese Communist Party
Sudanese Socialist Union

National Democratic Party
Surinamese Labour Party

Feminist Initiative
Communist League
Communist Party
Communist Party Of Sweden
Green Party
Left Party
Socialist Party
Socialist Justice Party
Swedish Social Democratic Party
Örebro Party

Alternative Left
Alternative List
Communist Party
Green Party of Switzerland
Social Democratic Party of Switzerland
Solidarity
Swiss Party of Labour

National Coordination Committee for Democratic Change
Democratic Union Party
National Democratic Rally
Syrian Democratic People's Party
Arab Revolutionary Workers Party
Arab Socialist Movement
Communist Labour Party
Democratic Arab Socialist Union
Democratic Socialist Arab Ba'ath Party
National Progressive Front
Arab Socialist Ba'ath Party – Syria Region
Arab Socialist Movement
Arab Socialist Union
Arabic Democratic Unionist Party
Democratic Socialist Unionist Party
National Vow Movement
Socialist Unionists
Syrian Communist Party (Bakdash)
Syrian Communist Party (Unified)
Popular Front for Change and Liberation
People's Will Party

T 

Pan-Green Coalition
Democratic Progressive Party
New Power Party
Taiwan Statebuilding Party
Taiwan Solidarity Union
Green Party Taiwan
Labor Party
Social Democratic Party (Taiwan)
Taiwan Communist Party

Communist Party of Tajikistan

Chama Cha Mapinduzi
Tanzania Labour Party

Move Forward Party

Workers' Party
Communist Party of Togo

Pridnestrovie Communist Party
Proriv

People's Empowerment Party
Congress of the People
United National Congress
Movement for Social Justice
Progressive Party

Congress for the Republic
Democratic Current
Democratic Forum for Labour and Liberties
Democratic Patriots' Unified Party (Popular Front)
Green Tunisia Party
Movement of Socialist Democrats
Nidaa Tounes
People's Movement
Popular Unity Movement
Social Democratic Path (Union for Tunisia)
Socialist Party
Tunisian Ba'ath Movement (Popular Front)
Unionist Democratic Union
Wafa Movement
Workers' Left League (Popular Front)
Workers' Party (Popular Front)

Bolshevik Party (North Kurdistan – Turkey)
Communist Labour Party of Turkey
Communist Party of Kurdistan
Communist Party of Turkey
Communist Party of Turkey (Workers Voice)
Communist Party of Turkey/Marxist–Leninist (Maoist Party Centre)
Communist Revolution Movement/Leninist
Communist Workers Party of Turkey
Democratic Left Party 
Freedom and Socialism Party
Movement for Change in Turkey
National Party
Patriotic Party
People's Ascent Party
Peoples' Democratic Congress
Democratic Regions Party
Green Left Party
Labour Party
Peoples' Democratic Party
Revolutionary Socialist Workers' Party
Socialist Democracy Party
Socialist Party of the Oppressed
Socialist Refoundation Party
People's Liberation Party
Peoples' United Revolutionary Movement
Communist Labour Party of Turkey/Leninist
Communist Party of Turkey/Marxist–Leninist
Devrimci Karargâh
Kurdistan Workers' Party
Maoist Communist Party
Marxist–Leninist Armed Propaganda Unit
Marxist–Leninist Communist Party
Republican People's Party
Revolutionary Communist Party of Turkey
Revolutionary Party of Kurdistan
Revolutionary People's Liberation Party/Front
Revolutionary People's Party (illegal)
Revolutionary People's Party (legal)
Revolutionary Workers' Party
Social Democratic People's Party
Socialist Alternative
Socialist Democratic Party
Socialist Liberation Party
Socialist Workers' Party of Turkey
United June Movement
Communist Movement of Turkey
Communist Party
Freedom and Solidarity Party
New Way
Labourist Movement Party
People's Communist Party of Turkey
Women's Party
Workers' Fraternity Party
Workers' Peasants' Party of Turkey

Communist Party of Turkmenistan

U 

Communist Party of Ukraine
Justice Party
Socialist Party of Ukraine

Communist Party of Britain
Communist Party of Great Britain (Provisional Central Committee)
Communist Party of Great Britain (Marxist-Leninist)
Co-operative Party 
Green Party of England and Wales
International Socialist Network
Left Unity
Labour Party (UK)
Mebyon Kernow
National Health Action Party
No2EU
Plaid Cymru
Reality Party
Respect Party
Scottish National Party
Sinn Féin
Social Democratic and Labour Party
Socialist Party of Great Britain
Socialist Party (England and Wales) 
Socialist Party (Ireland)
Socialist Resistance
Socialist Workers Party
Socialist Labour Party
Workers Power
Workers' Party (Ireland)

African People's Socialist Party
All-African People's Revolutionary Party
Black Riders Liberation Party
California National Party
Committees of Correspondence for Democracy and Socialism
Communist Party USA
Communist Party USA (Provisional)
Democratic Socialists of America
Ecology Democracy Party
Freedom Road Socialist Organization
Freedom Socialist Party
Green Party of the United States
Greens/Green Party USA
Democratic Party (disputed)
International Socialist Organization
International Workers Party
Justice Party
League for the Revolutionary Party
Legal Marijuana Now Party
Liberal Party of New York
Liberty Union Party
Movement for a People's Party
Natural Law Party 
New Afrikan Black Panther Party
Oregon Progressive Party
Party for Socialism and Liberation
Peace and Freedom Party
Progressive Labor Party
Revolutionary Communist Party, USA
Revolutionary Workers League
Social Democrats, USA
Socialist Action
Socialist Alternative
Socialist Equality Party
Socialist Labor Party of America
Socialist Party USA
Socialist Workers Organization
Socialist Workers Party
Solidarity
Spark
Spartacist League
U.S. Marxist–Leninist Organization
Vermont Progressive Party
Women's Equality Party
Workers Party, USA
Workers World Party
Working Families Party
World Socialist Party of the United States

Frente Amplio
Socialist Party of Uruguay
Communist Party of Uruguay
Movement of Popular Participation
Christian Democratic Party of Uruguay
New Space
Vertiente Artiguista
Party of the Communes
Broad Front Confluence
Progressive Alliance
Partido por la Victoria del Pueblo
Tupamaro National Liberation Movement
Popular Assembly
March 26 Movement

People's Democratic Party of Uzbekistan
Justice Social Democratic Party
Ecological Movement of Uzbekistan

V 

A New Era (Democratic Unity Roundtable)
Alliance for Change (Great Patriotic Pole)
Communist Party of Venezuela (Great Patriotic Pole)
Democratic Action (Democratic Unity Roundtable)
Democratic Republican Union
Fatherland for All (Great Patriotic Pole)
Fearless People's Alliance (Democratic Unity Roundtable)
For Social Democracy (Great Patriotic Pole)
Internationalism
Justice First (Democratic Unity Roundtable)
Marxist–Leninist Communist Party of Venezuela
Movement for a Responsible, Sustainable and Entrepreneurial Venezuela (Democratic Unity Roundtable)
Movement for Socialism (Democratic Unity Roundtable)
New Revolutionary Road (Great Patriotic Pole)
Organized Socialist Party in Venezuela (Great Patriotic Pole)
People's Electoral Movement (Great Patriotic Pole)
Popular Will (Democratic Unity Roundtable)
Progressive Advance (Democratic Unity Roundtable)
Radical Cause (Democratic Unity Roundtable)
Red Flag Party
Revolutionary Middle Class
Revolutionary Socialism
Tupamaro (Great Patriotic Pole)
United Socialist Party of Venezuela (Great Patriotic Pole)
Venezuelan Popular Unity (Great Patriotic Pole)

Communist Party of Vietnam

W 

Welsh Labour
Plaid Cymru
Llais Gwynedd

Frente Polisario

Y 

Arab Socialist Ba'ath Party – Yemen Region
Democratic Nasserist Party
Nasserist Reform Organisation
Nasserist Unionist People's Organisation
National Arab Socialist Ba'ath Party – Yemen Region
Yemeni Socialist Party

Z 

Movement for Multi-Party Democracy
Patriotic Front

Movement for Democratic Change – Ncube
Movement for Democratic Change – Tsvangirai
ZANU–PF
Zimbabwe African People's Union
Zimbabwe People's Democratic Party

Ruling

Former 
 Afghanistan – People's Democratic Party of Afghanistan, Settam-e-Melli, Shola-e Javid
 Albania – Democratic Front of Albania, National Liberation Movement, Party of Labour of Albania
 Algeria – Algerian Communist Party, Socialist Vanguard Party
 Angola  – Angolan Communist Party, Communist Committee of Cabinda, Communist Organization of Angola
 Antigua and Barbuda – Antigua Caribbean Liberation Movement
 Argentina – Alliance for Work, Justice and Education, Argentine Socialist Vanguard Party, Democratic Socialist Party, Encuentro Amplio, Female Peronist Party, Front for a Country in Solidarity, Independent Socialist Party, Intransigent Radical Civic Union, Popular Socialist Party, Socialist Party of the National Left, Unitarian Party, United Left, Workers' Revolutionary Party
 Armenia – Armenian Workers Communist Party, Communist Party of Armenia, Marxist Party of Armenia, Renewed Communist Party of Armenia, Union of Communists of Armenia
 Australia – Australian Party, Australian Workers Party, Communist Party of Australia, Democratic Socialist Perspective, Industrial Labor Party, Industrial Socialist Labor Party, National Labor Party, Nuclear Disarmament Party, Protestant Labour Party, Restore the Workers' Rights Party, Social Democratic Party, Socialist Democracy, Socialist Labor Party, State Labor Party, Victorian Socialist Party
 Austria – Communist Initiative, Communist League of Austria, Czechoslovak Social Democratic Workers Party in the Republic of Austria, JETZT, League of Democratic Socialists, Marxist–Leninist Party of Austria, Union of Revolutionary Workers of Austria (Marxist–Leninist)
 Azerbaijan – Muslim Social Democratic Party
 Bahamas – Vanguard Nationalist and Socialist Party
 Bahrain – Popular Front for the Liberation of Bahrain
 Bangladesh – Bangladesh Krishak Sramik Awami League
 Barbados – Workers Party of Barbados
 Belarus – Belarusian Ecological Party, Belarusian Socialist Party, People's Accord Party
 Byelorussian Soviet Socialist Republic – Belarusian Peasants' and Workers' Union, Communist Party of Byelorussia, Communist Party of Western Belorussia
 Belarusian Democratic Republic – Belarusian Socialist Assembly, General Jewish Labour Bund
 Belgium – Belgian Socialist Party, Communist Party of Belgium
 Benin – People's Revolutionary Party of Benin
 Bhutan – Druk Chirwang Tshogpa
 Bolivia – Movement Without Fear, Revolutionary Left Party
 Bosnia and Herzegovina – League of Communists of Bosnia and Herzegovina, Social Democratic Union of Bosnia and Herzegovina
 Brazil – Brazilian Labour Party, Free Fatherland Party, Proletarian Liberation Party, Syndicalist Popular Party, Workers' General Party
 Brunei – Brunei People's Party
 Bulgaria – Bulgarian Communist Party, Bulgarian Fatherland Front, Bulgarian Social Democratic Workers Party (Broad Socialists)
 Burkina Faso – African Independence Party, African Independence Party (Touré), Burkinabé Bolshevik Party, Burkinabé Communist Group, Burkinabé Socialist Bloc, Burkinabé Socialist Party, Change 2005, Convention of Progress Forces, Democratic Forces for Progress, Marxist–Leninist Group, Movement for Socialist Democracy, Organization for Popular Democracy – Labour Movement, Party for Democracy and Socialism, Party of Labour of Burkina, Patriotic League for Development, Popular Front, Rally of Social-Democrat Independents, Sankarist Pan-African Convention, Union of Burkinabé Communists, Union of Burkinabé Communists, Union of Communist Struggles – Reconstructed, Union of Communist Struggles – The Flame, Voltaic Communist Organization, Voltaic Labour Party
 Burundi – Burundi Workers' Party
 Cambodia – Cambodian National Unity Party, Communist Party of Kampuchea, Democratic Party, Khmer National Solidarity Party, Khmer Neutral Party, Khmer Rouge, Party of Democratic Kampuchea, Pracheachon, United Issarak Front
 Canada – Alberta Labor Representation League, Canadian Action Party, Cape Breton Labour Party, Communist Party of Canada (Marxist–Leninist) (Manitoba), Communist Party of Quebec, Co-operative Commonwealth Federation, Co-operative Commonwealth Federation (Manitoba), Co-operative Commonwealth Federation (Ontario Section), Democratic Alliance, Dominion Labor Party, Groupe socialiste des travailleurs du Québec, Helping Hand Party, Labor-Progressive Party, League for Socialist Action, Montréal Écologique, National Party of Canada, National Party of Canada (1979), Newfoundland People's Party, Option nationale, Parti de la Democratie Socialiste, Parti innovateur du Québec, Parti rouge, Parti social démocratique du Québec, Parti socialiste du Québec, Party for Accountability, Competency and Transparency, People's Front, Progressive Party of Canada, Reform movement, Regroupement des militants syndicaux, Revolutionary Workers League/Ligue Ouvrière Révolutionnaire, Revolutionary Workers League (in Manitoba), Socialist Labor Party, Socialist Party of British Columbia, Socialist Party of Canada, Socialist Party of North America, Strength in Democracy, Union des forces progressistes, United Party of Canada, Vision Montreal, Winnipeg into the '90s, Workers' Communist Party
 Chad - Chadian Progressive Party
 Chile – Citizen Left, Concertación, Democratic Alliance of Chile, Democratic Party, MAS Region, New Democratic Left, Nueva Mayoría, Popular Front, Popular Unitary Action Movement, Popular Unity, Socialist Democratic Party
 China - China Democratic Socialist Party, Productive People's Party, Zhi Xian Party
 Colombia - Clandestine Colombian Communist Party, Hope, Peace, and Liberty
 Congo, Democratic Republic of the – Mouvement National Congolais, Parti Solidaire Africain
 Congo, Republic of the – National Movement of the Revolution
 Costa Rica - Democratic Force, National Rescue Party
 Croatia – Dalmatian Action, League of Communists of Croatia, Social Democratic Party of Croatia and Slavonia
 Cuba – Partido Auténtico, Partido Ortodoxo, People's Party, Popular Socialist Party, Socialist Party of Manzanillo
 Cyprus - Committee for a Radical Left Rally, Fighting Democratic Movement
 Czech Republic – Friends of Beer Party, Liberal-Social Union, Party for Life Security, Party of the Democratic Left
 Czechoslovakia - Carpatho-Russian Labour Party of Small Peasants and Landless, Communist Party of Czechoslovakia, Communist Party of Czechoslovakia (German Division), Communist Party of Czechoslovakia (Leninists), Communist Party of Slovakia, Communist Party of Slovakia – 91, German Social Democratic Workers' Party in the Czechoslovak Republic, Hungarian-German Social Democratic Party, Labour Party, Marxist Left in Slovakia and the Transcarpathian Ukraine, National Front, National Labour Party, Polish People's Party, Social Democratic Workers' Party in Subcarpathian Rus', Socialist League of the New East, Socialist Party of the Czechoslovak Working People, The Party of Moderate Progress Within the Bounds of the Law, Union of Communists of Slovakia
 Denmark – Common Course, Communist League, Fokus, Left Socialists, National Liberal Party
 Dominican Republic – Blue Party, Dominican Communist Party
 Egypt – Arab Socialist Union, Democratic Movement for National Liberation, Liberal Constitutional Party
 El Salvador - National Opposing Union
 Equatorial Guinea - Popular Idea of Equatorial Guinea
 Eritrea - Eritrean Democratic Working People's Party, Eritrean People's Liberation Front
 Estonia – Communist Party of Estonia, Communist Party of Estonia (1990), Constitution Party, Estonian Labour Party, Estonian Left Party, Estonian Social Democratic Workers' Party, Intermovement
 Eswatini - Swaziland Communist Party
 Ethiopia – All-Ethiopia Socialist Movement, Commission for Organizing the Party of the Working People of Ethiopia, Ethiopian People's Revolutionary Democratic Front, Ethiopian Somali People's Democratic Party, Marxist–Leninist League of Tigray, Oromo Democratic Party, Workers' Party of Ethiopia
 Faroe Islands - Faroese Communist Party, Faroese Socialists, Oyggjaframi (M-L)
 Finland – Ålandic Left, Communist Party of Finland, Democratic Alternative, Finnish People's Democratic League, For the Poor, Left Group of Finnish Workers, Radical People's Party, Reform Group, Social Democratic Union of Workers and Smallholders, Socialist Unity Party, Socialist Workers Party, Socialist Workers Party of Finland, Workers' Party of Finland
 France – Alternative libertaire, Cordeliers, Enragés, French Section of the Workers' International, Hébertists, Jacobin, Proletarian Unity Party, Revolutionary Communist League, Socialist Party of France, The Mountain, Unified Socialist Party, Workers' Party
 Gambia, The - Gambia Socialist Revolutionary Party
 Georgia – Communist Party of Georgia, Democratic Union for Revival, Georgian Socialist-Federalist Revolutionary Party, Social Democratic Party of Georgia, Union of Citizens of Georgia
 Germany – Labour and Social Justice – The Electoral Alternative, Party of Democratic Socialism, Socialist Unity Party of West Berlin, United Left
 Divided Germany - Communist Party of Germany, Communist Party of Germany/Marxists–Leninists, East German Green Party, German Democratic Union, Social Democratic Party in the GDR, Socialist Unity Party of Germany
 Nazi Germany - Communist Party of Germany (Opposition), Socialist Workers' Party of Germany
 Weimar Republic - Communist Workers' Party of Germany, Independent Social Democratic Party of Germany, Old Social Democratic Party of Germany, Spartacus League
 German Empire - Free-minded People's Party, General German Workers' Association, German Free-minded Party, German People's Party, German Progress Party, National-Social Association, Progressive People's Party, Social Democratic Workers' Party of Germany
 Ghana – People's Convention Party, People's National Party
 Gibraltar - Association for the Advancement of Civil Rights, Gibraltar Labour Party, Reform Party
 Greece – Communist Party of Greece (Interior), Democratic Socialist Party of Greece, Greek Left, Left Liberals, Movement for a United Communist Party of Greece, National Political Union, Organisation of Marxist–Leninist Communists of Greece, Party of Democratic Socialism, Party of Radicals, Progress and Left Forces Alliance, Radical Left Front, Radical Movement of Social Democratic Alliance, Reformers for Democracy and Development, Socialist Party of Greece, United Democratic Left, United Left, United Socialist Alignment of Greece
 Greenland - Labour Party
 Grenada – New Jewel Movement, Maurice Bishop Patriotic Movement
 Guatemala – Guatemalan Party of Labour, Guatemalan Christian Democracy, Movimiento Nueva República, Party of the Guatemalan Revolution, Revolutionary Action Party, Socialist Party
 Guinea – Socialist Democracy of Guinea
 Haiti – Haitian Communist Party, Popular Socialist Party, Unified Party of Haitian Communists
 Honduras - Party for the Transformation of Honduras
 Hong Kong - Citizens Party, Community March, Democratic Progressive Party of Hong Kong, Democratic Self-Government Party of Hong Kong, Demosisto, Hong Kong Affairs Society, Hong Kong Confederation of Trade Unions, Hong Kong Observers, Hong Kong Socialist Democratic Party, Meeting Point, Social Democratic Forum, Team Chu Hoi-dick of New Territories West, The Frontier, United Democrats of Hong Kong
 Hungary – 4K! – Fourth Republic!, Address Party, Democratic Coalition Party, Democratic Party, Humanist Party, Hungarian Communist Party, Hungarian Radical Party, Hungarian Socialist Workers' Party, Hungarian Working People's Party, Left Centre, Opposition Party, Party of Independence and '48, Resolution Party, United Opposition
 Iceland – Communist Party of Iceland, Communist Party of Iceland (Marxist–Leninist), National Awakening, National Preservation Party, People's Alliance, People's Unity Party – Socialist Party, Rainbow, Social Democratic Party, Women's List
 India – Congress Socialist Party, Ghadar Movement, Praja Socialist Party, Samta Party, Samyukta Socialist Party
 Indonesia – Acoma Party, Communist Party of Indonesia, Indonesian Islamic Union Party, Indonesian National Party, Labour Party, Murba Party, Partai Tionghoa Indonesia, Permai, Socialist Party of Indonesia
 Iran – Communist Party of Persia, Organization of Iranian People's Fedai Guerrillas, Organization of Struggle for the Emancipation of the Working Class
 Iraq – Ila al-Amam, Iraqi Communist Party, Iraqi Communist Party (Central Command) (Widhat al-Qa'idah), Iraqi Communist Vanguard Organisation, League of Iraqi Communists, Leninist Group in the Iraqi Communist Movement, National Democratic Party, Organization of Iraqi Revolutionary Communists, People's Union, Rayat ash-Shaghilah
 Ireland – Clann na Poblachta, Democratic Left, Democratic Socialist Party, Independent Socialist Party, Saor Éire, Socialist Labour Party, Workers Power
 Israel – Ahdut HaAvoda, Alignment, Democratic Union, Faction independent of Ahdut HaAvoda, Fighters' List, Hebrew Communists, Independent Socialist Faction, Left Camp of Israel, Left Faction, Maki, Mapai, Mapam, Matzpen, Meri, Moked, One Israel, One Nation, Progressive List for Peace, Rafi, Ratz, Unity Party, Ya'ad – Civil Rights Movement
 Italy – Communist Party of the Free Territory of Trieste, Democratic Left, Democrats of the Left, Federation of the Greens, Italian Communist Party, Italian Democratic Socialists, Italian Socialist Party, Italian Socialist Party of Proletarian Unity, Marxist–Leninist Italian Communist Party, Proletarian Democracy, Proletarian Unity Party, Venetian Left (2015)
 Jamaica – Workers Party of Jamaica
 Japan – Democratic Socialist Party, Farmer-Labour Party, Japan Labour-Farmer Party, Japan Socialist Party, Leftist Socialist Party of Japan, Rightist Socialist Party of Japan
 Jersey – Jersey Communist Party
 Kenya – Kenya People's Union
 Kosovo – League of Communists of Kosovo, Partia e Fortë
 Kyrgyzstan – Communist Party of Kirghizia
 Laos – Pathet Lao
 Latvia – Communist Party of Latvia, General Jewish Labour Bund in Latvia, Latvian Social Democratic Party, Revolutionary Socialist Party of Latvia
 Lebanon – Lebanese National Movement
 Liberia – Progressive Alliance of Liberia
 Lithuania – Communist Party of Lithuania, Democratic Labour Party of Lithuania, Front Party, Socialist Party of Lithuania
 Luxembourg – Social Democratic Party
 Macedonia – League of Communists of Macedonia
 Malaysia – Communist Party of Malaya, Labour Party of Malaya
 Maldives - Gaumee Itthihaad
 Malta - Democratic Alternative
 Mali – Sudanese Union – African Democratic Rally (original)
 Mexico – Mexican Communist Party, Mexican Liberal Party, Mexican People's Party, Mexican Workers' Party, Party of the Cardenist Front of National Reconstruction, Social Democracy, Social Democratic Party, Socialist Convergence, Socialist Mexican Party, Unified Socialist Party of Mexico, Workers' Revolutionary Party
 Moldova – Communist Party of Moldova
 Mongolia - Mongolian People's Revolutionary Party
 Montenegro – League of Communists of Montenegro
 Morocco – Democratic Socialist Party, Ila al-Amam, Labour Party, Moroccan Communist Party, National Union of Popular Forces, Socialist Party
 Myanmar – Anti-Fascist People's Freedom League, Burma Socialist Party, Burma Socialist Programme Party, Burma Workers Party, Communist Party of Burma (original)
 Nepal – Communist Party of Nepal
 Netherlands – Communist Party of the Netherlands, Democratic Socialists '70, Independent Socialist Party, Pacifist Socialist Party, Political Party of Radicals, Revolutionary Socialist Party, Social Democratic League, Social Democratic Workers' Party, Socialist Party
 New Zealand – Communist Party of New Zealand, Democratic Labour Party, Independent Political Labour League, Jim Anderton's Progressive Party, NewLabour Party, New Zealand Socialist Party, Residents Action Movement, United Labour Party
 Niger – Sawaba
 Nigeria – Socialist Workers and Farmers Party of Nigeria
 North Korea – Workers' Party of North Korea
 Norway – Radical Socialists, Red Electoral Alliance, Social Democratic Labour Party of Norway, Workers' Communist Party
 Oman – Dhofar Liberation Front, Popular Front for the Liberation of Oman, Popular Front for the Liberation of the Occupied Arabian Gulf
 Pakistan – Azad Pakistan Party, Labour Party Pakistan, National Awami Party, Pakistan Communist Party, Pakistan Socialist Party
 Palestinian territories – National Liberation League in Palestine, Palestine Communist Party
 Poland – Social Democracy of the Kingdom of Poland and Lithuania, Communist Party of Poland, Polish Workers' Party, Polish United Workers' Party, Communist Party of the Free City of Danzig, Social Democratic Party of the Free City of Danzig, Union of Polish Patriots
 Portugal – Leftwing Union for the Socialist Democracy, Portuguese Socialist Party
 Puerto Rico – Puerto Rican Socialist Party, Puerto Rican Communist Party
 Romania – General Jewish Labour Bund in Romania, Ploughmen's Front, Romanian Communist Party, Romanian Social Democratic Party, Romanian Social Party, Social Democratic Party of Romania, Socialist Party of Romania
 Russia – Agrarian Party of Russia, Civic Union, Civil United Green Alternative, Committee for Workers' Democracy and International Socialism, Communist Party of the Republic of Tatarstan, Communist Party of the Russian Soviet Federative Socialist Republic, Confederation of Anarcho-Syndicalists, Green Alliance, Ivan Rybkin Bloc, Party of Social Justice, Party of Workers' Self-Government, Patriots of Russia, Russian Communist Workers Party, Russian United Social Democratic Party, Social Democratic Party of Russia (1990), Social Democratic Party of Russia (2001), Social Democratic Party of Russia (2012), Socialist League Vpered, Socialist Resistance, Socialist United Party of Russia, Spiritual Heritage, Stalin Bloc – For the USSR, Trade Unions and Industrialists – Union of Labour, Tuvan People's Revolutionary Party, Union of Greens of Russia, Union of Social Democrats
 Soviet Union – Anti-Party Group, Communist Party of the Soviet Union, Group of Democratic Centralism, Left Opposition, Left School, Left Socialist-Revolutionaries, Left-Right Bloc, Neo-Communist Party of the Soviet Union, Party of New Communists, Right Opposition, State Committee on the State of Emergency, True Communists, Union of Marxist-Leninists, United Opposition, Workers Group of the Russian Communist Party, Workers' Opposition, Workers' Truth
 Russian Empire – Black Repartition, Circle of Tchaikovsky, Emancipation of Labour, General Jewish Labour Bund, Jewish Communist Party (Poalei Zion), Jewish Social Democratic Labour Party (Poalei Zion), Jewish Socialist Workers Party, Land and Liberty, League of Struggle for the Emancipation of the Working Class, Left Socialist-Revolutionaries, Narodnaya Volya, Party of Narodnik Communists, Party of Revolutionary Communism, People's Rights Party, Petrashevsky Circle, Popular Socialists, Russian Social Democratic Labour Party, Russian Social Democratic Labour Party (Bolsheviks), Russian Social Democratic Labour Party (Internationalists), Russian Social Democratic Labour Party (Mensheviks), Russian Social Democratic Labour Party (of Internationalists), Socialist Revolutionary Party, Trudoviks, Union of Socialists-Revolutionaries Maximalists, Union of Working Peasants Workers' Party for the Political Liberation of Russia, Zionist Socialist Workers Party
 Saint Lucia – National Alliance
 Saint Vincent and the Grenadines – Saint Vincent Labour Party
 San Marino – Sammarinese Communist Party, Sammarinese Socialist Party, Sammarinese Communist Refoundation
 Saudi Arabia – Arab Socialist Action Party – Arabian Peninsula, Communist Party in Saudi Arabia
 Serbia – League of Communists of Serbia, League of Communists of Vojvodina
 Singapore – Barisan Sosialis, Labour Front
 Slovakia – Communist Party of Slovakia
 Slovenia – League of Communists of Slovenia
 Solomon Islands – Solomon Islands Labour Party
 Somalia – Somali Revolutionary Socialist Party
 South Africa – Labour Party
 South Korea – Communist Party of Korea, Workers Party of South Korea, Laboring People's Party, Progressive Party, United Socialist Party of Korea, Democratic Labor Party, Unified Progressive Party, Socialist Party, New Progressive Party, People's United PartySee the article: Progressivism in South Korea
 Spain – Batasuna, Communist Party of the Basque Homelands, Workers' Party of Marxist Unification
 Sudan – Sudanese Socialist Union
 Suriname – Communist Party of Suriname
 Switzerland – Communist Party of Switzerland, Progressive Organizations of Switzerland
 Taiwan – China Democratic Socialist Party, Taiwanese Communist Party
 Tanzania – Afro-Shirazi Party, Tanganyika African National Union, Umma Party
 Thailand – Communist Party of Thailand, Socialist Party of Thailand
 Togo – Juvento, Pan-African Socialist Party
 Trinidad and Tobago – Butler Party, Democratic Labour Party, United Labour Front, Workers and Farmers Party, Trinidad Labour Party, Communist Party of Trinidad and Tobago, Caribbean Socialist Party, Caribbean National Labour Party, Tobago Organization of the People
 Tunisia – Tunisian Communist Party
 Turkey – Communist Party of Turkey, Democratic People's Party, Democratic Society Party, Equality and Democracy Party, Social Democracy Party (SODEP), Social Democratic Populist Party, Workers Party of Turkey
 Turkmenistan – Communist Party of Turkmenistan
 Ukraine – Borotbisty, Communist Party of Ukraine
 United Kingdom – Chartist Party, Common Wealth Party, Communist Party of Great Britain, Independent Labour Party, National Labour Organisation, Republican Labour Party, Social Democratic Federation
 United States – American Labor Party, Farmer-Labor Party, New Alliance Party, Nonpartisan League, Proletarian Party of America, Social Democratic Party, Socialist Party of America, Workers Party, Workingmen's Party of the United States
 Uzbekistan – Communist Party of Uzbekistan
 Venezuela – Fifth Republic Movement, People's Electoral Movement, Revolutionary Left Movement
 Vietnam – Indochinese Communist Party, National Liberation Front
 Yemen – National Liberation Front
 Yugoslavia – League of Communists of Yugoslavia
 Zimbabwe – United Progressive Party

See also
 List of right-wing political parties
 List of centrist political parties
 List of syncretic political parties

Politics
Left-wing politics
Centre-left
Far left
Ultra left
Radical left (disambiguation)
Labour movement
Marxism
Social democracy
Socialism

Parties
International Communist Party
Communist Party
Communist party (disambiguation)
Democratic Socialist Party
Global Greens
List of Labour Parties
Progressive Alliance
Social Democratic Party
Socialist Equality Party
Socialist International
Socialist Labour Party
Socialist Party
Socialist Workers Party
Labor Party (disambiguation)
Workers' Party
Lists of political parties

References

External links
 "Leftist Parties of the World". Retrieved 4 October 2006.

Left-wing